The Global Energy Network Institute (GENI) is a research and education organization founded by Peter Meisen in 1986 and registered as a 501(c)(3) non-profit organization in 1991. GENI's focus is on the interconnection of electric power transmission networks between nations and continents, emphasizing tapping abundant renewable energy resources, and utilizing the efficiencies of seasonal, time of day, and load differences around the world.

Renewable Energy Interconnected Global Grid 

GENI's goal is to educate world leaders and policy makers on the benefits of this global strategy. The concept of an interconnected global grid linked to renewable resources was first suggested by Buckminster Fuller in the World Game simulation in the 1970s.  Fuller concluded that this strategy is the highest priority of the World Game simulation, (see page 206 of Fuller's book Critical Path (1981).

GENI has organized international workshops on international electricity transmission grids and coordinated workshops on renewable energy generation, the latter hosted by the IEEE Power Engineering Society.

GENI is one of the original members of American Council on Renewable Energy and has been a regular presence at the World Energy Congress, held internationally every 3 years.

GENI has stated that one reason technologies to accelerate the use of renewable energy and to avert climate change were not making headway in the marketplace has been the lack of ways for investors to track and easily invest in these technologies. Because of this, in 2004, GENI partnered with KLD, who creates socially conscious investing stock indexes in the US, to create the KLD Global Climate 100 stock index. The index became available for investment in Japan in 2005 and in the U.S. on April 24, 2007.

Research 

GENI's research includes information about national electricity power grids; location and availability of renewable energy resources; international integrated energy models; current national energy usage (by fuel type) and global issues that are addressed by the GENI concept, such as  international relations, human security, peace and disarmament, the environment, conflict and development, and global health.

Selected Media References 

Numerous articles have been published on and about the organization, the concept, and its personnel in the following publications. Some are in academic and professional publications:
 Simulation, (April, 1995) (A monthly peer-reviewed publication of the Society for Computer Simulation);
New Scientist,(July, 1995);
IEEE Power Engineering Review, (Several) (A monthly peer-reviewed publication of the IEEE); (GENI organized the ongoing series of Power Engineering Society panel sessions on various renewable energy technologies.);
The Rotarian, April 2007, In Focus column on Peter Meisen and GENI;

A.A. Bolonkin and R.B. Cathcart, "Antarctica: a southern hemisphere wind power station?", INT. J. GLOBAL ENVIRONMENTAL ISSUES 8: 262-273 (2008). [They propose windpower base of 450 GW output connected to the Global Energy Electric Grid via undersea HVDC cable.]

Some are in general one:
 The Globe and Mail, (August, 1990);
 Nippon Keizai Shinbun, (June, 1992);
 Novosti, (February, 1990);
The Rotarian, (April, 2007) (A publication of Rotary International);
San Diego Union Tribune, (Several, beginning in 1998);
The Santa Fe Sun (March, 1990);
Tomorrow, Global Environment Business, (Jan/March 1993); Wired (magazine) (September, 2003).

Key Personnel 

 Peter Meisen, Founder and President (University of California, San Diego, Applied Mechanics and Engineering Sciences)
 Paul-Michael Dekker, IT Director (University of Waterloo, B.A.Sc. Systems Design Engineering)
 Patricia Stevens, Chief of Operations (University of Washington, MSc Food Science and Technology)
 Nyhl Henson, Board of Director. (Southern Illinois University, Carbondale IL, Communications and Journalism)

Incorporation

The Global Energy Network Institute (or GENI) is a research and education organization founded in 1986. It was officially registered as a 501(c)(3) non-profit Corporation in 1991.

See also 
 Coal phase out

References

External links
www.GENI.org

Organizations established in 1986
Electric power distribution
Non-profit organizations based in California
Renewable energy organizations based in the United States